was a Japanese football player. He played for Japan national team.

Club career
Kagawa was born in Hiroshima Prefecture. He played for his local club Rijo Shukyu-Dan. He won 1924 and 1925 Emperor's Cup with international players Naoemon Shimizu and Shizuo Miyama.

National team career
In May 1925, Kagawa was selected Japan national team for 1925 Far Eastern Championship Games in Manila. At this competition, on May 17, he debuted against Philippines. On May 20, he also played against Republic of China. But Japan lost in both matches (0-4, v Philippines and 0-2, v Republic of China). He played 2 games for Japan in 1925.

National team statistics

References

External links
 
 Japan National Football Team Database

Year of birth missing
Year of death missing
Kyoto University alumni
Association football people from Hiroshima Prefecture
Japanese footballers
Japan international footballers
Association football forwards